Choi Won-young (born Choi Seong-wook on January 10, 1976) is a South Korean actor.

Career
Choi Won-young made his acting debut in 2002's Sex Is Zero, and has since appeared in both film and television. But his most notable roles have been in the TV dramas While You Were Sleeping, A Hundred Year Legacy, Sky Castle, Doctor Prisoner, Hwarang: The Beginning, Mad Dog as well as the low-budget crime thriller Your Time Is Up, which premiered at the 2012 Busan International Film Festival.

Personal life
Choi married actress Shim Yi-young on February 28, 2014, at the Grand Ballroom of the COEX Walkerhill Hotel in Samseong-dong. Choi and Shim met while filming the 2013 TV series A Hundred Year Legacy, where they played a married couple. On June 23, 2014, Choi's wife gave birth to their first child, a daughter. The couple's second daughter was born on June 14, 2017.

Filmography

Film

Television series

Television show

Music video

Theater

Awards and nominations

References

External links 
 
 
 

1976 births
South Korean male stage actors
South Korean male film actors
South Korean male television actors
Living people
21st-century South Korean male actors